Liede Bridge is a bridge crossing over the Pearl River in Guangzhou, Guangdong, China. The  bridge connects Pazhou Island in Haizhu District with Tianhe District and opened in 2009.

References

External links
Liede Bridge on Flickr

Bridges completed in 2009
Suspension bridges in China
Bridges in Guangzhou
Bridges over the Pearl River (China)